Adolf M. Birke (born 12 October 1939 in Wellingholzhausen) is professor emeritus of modern history at the University of Munich. He was director of the German Historical Institute London from August 1977 to July 1985.

References

20th-century German historians
1939 births
Living people
People from Melle, Germany
Academics of the German Historical Institute London
Academic staff of the Ludwig Maximilian University of Munich